Liège Island (in English also Liege Island) is an island,  long and  wide, lying immediately northeast of Brabant Island in the Palmer Archipelago, and separated from Hoseason Island and Christiania Islands to the northeast by Croker Passage. Its interior is occupied by Brugmann Mountains.

British mapping in 1978 and 1980.

The island was charted by the Belgian Antarctic Expedition (1897–1899) under Adrien de Gerlache, who named it for the province of Liège, Belgium.

Maps
 British Antarctic Territory.  Scale 1:200000 topographic map.  DOS 610 Series, Sheet W 64 60.  Directorate of Overseas Surveys, UK, 1978.
 British Antarctic Territory.  Scale 1:200000 topographic map.  DOS 610 Series, Sheet W 64 62.  Directorate of Overseas Surveys, UK, 1980.
Antarctic Digital Database (ADD). Scale 1:250000 topographic map of Antarctica. Scientific Committee on Antarctic Research (SCAR). Since 1993, regularly upgraded and updated.

See also
 Composite Antarctic Gazetteer
 List of Antarctic and sub-Antarctic islands
 List of Antarctic islands south of 60° S 
 Mount Pierre (Palmer Archipelago)
 SCAR
 Territorial claims in Antarctica

References

External links
 U.S. Geological Survey, Atlas of Antarctic Research

 
Islands of the Palmer Archipelago